"Let's Go Get Stoned" is a song originally recorded by The Coasters in May 1965. It was written by Nickolas Ashford, Valerie Simpson, and Josephine Armstead. Ronnie Milsap recorded it in October 1965 as a B-side to the single, "Never Had It So Good.

Ray Charles recording
It was a 1966 number one R&B hit for American recording artist Ray Charles. The single was released shortly after Charles was released from rehab after a 16-year heroin addiction. Charles heard a 1965 recording of the song by Ronnie Milsap. According to Milsap, Charles liked his version of the song so much that he decided to record it himself. It is notable for being one of Ashford & Simpson's first successful compositions together; the duo also penned Charles' "I Don't Need No Doctor".

Chart positions

Other notable covers
 Manfred Mann recorded the song on their #1 British EP No Living Without Loving, which topped the UK EP chart in December 1965.
 The Amboy Dukes recorded a cover for their 1967 eponymous album
 James Brown released a recording of the song as a single.
 Big Mama Thornton recorded the song for her 1969 album Stronger Than Dirt.  
 Joe Cocker performed the song at Woodstock in August 1969.

References

1966 singles
Songs written by Valerie Simpson
Songs written by Nickolas Ashford
The Coasters songs
Ray Charles songs
Manfred Mann songs
James Brown songs
Big Mama Thornton songs
Joe Cocker songs
Songs written by Jo Armstead
1966 songs
ABC Records singles